Walking with Dinosaurs is a television documentary produced by the BBC.

Walking with Dinosaurs may also refer to:

Walking with Dinosaurs (film), 2013
Walking with Dinosaurs (video game), 2013

See also
Walking with...